Edmund O'Reilly may refer to:

 Edmund O'Reilly (bishop) (1616–1669), Roman Catholic Archbishop of Armagh
 Edmund O'Reilly (theologian) (1811–1878), Catholic theologian